Lambert's sea snake (Hydrophis lamberti) is a marine snake native to waters around Thailand, Vietnam, Singapore, Malaysia and the Philippines.

References

Hydrophis
Reptiles described in 1917